This is a list of Italian organized crime groups around the world. This list does not include all groups, clans or families identified as Cosa Nostra (Mafia crime families). This list does not include all Camorra, 'Ndrangheta or Sacra Corona Unita clans ("crime families").

Italy
In Italy there are many different Mafia-like organizations.

Veneto
In the Region of Veneto the Mala del Brenta operate in the area.

Lombardy
In the Region of Lombardy the defunct Banda della Comasina operated in the area.

Lazio
In the Region of Lazio the Banda della Magliana and the Mafia Capitale operate in the area.

Basilicata
In the Region of Basilicata the defunct Basilischi operated in the area.

Apulia
In the Region of Apulia the Sacra Corona Unita clans control the area.

Calabria

In the Region of Calabria the 'Ndrangheta clans control the area.

Campania

In the Region of Campania the Camorra clans control the area.

Sicily

In the Region of Sicily the Sicilian Mafia clans and the Stidda control the area.

United States
According to the 2004 New Jersey State Commission of Investigation, there were 24 active Mafia families in the United States. In 2004, author Thomas Milhorn reported that the Mafia was active in 26 cities across the United States.

Northeastern United States

New York
The Five Families – operate in New York City, the New York Metropolitan area, New Jersey, Connecticut, Massachusetts, Pennsylvania, Florida, California and Nevada.
Bonanno
Colombo
Gambino
Genovese
Lucchese

Western New York
Buffalo crime family (Magaddino family)
Rochester crime family – defunct

New Jersey
DeCavalcante crime family (mostly North Jersey and Central Jersey)
Five Families have crews operating in New Jersey
Lucchese crime family New Jersey faction
Genovese crime family New Jersey faction
Cherry Hill Gambinos
Philadelphia crime family operates in South Jersey, including Atlantic City, and Trenton

Pennsylvania
Philadelphia crime family (Bruno-Scarfo family)
Bufalino crime family (Northeastern Pennsylvania, particularly Pittston, Wilkes-Barre, Scranton and the Wyoming Valley area) –  defunct
Pittsburgh crime family (LaRocca family) – semi-dufunct

New England
Patriarca crime family (Boston, Massachusetts and Providence, Rhode Island), parts of Connecticut.
Genovese family Springfield crew (Springfield, Massachusetts) and New Haven crew (New Haven, Connecticut) and some action in Lewiston, Maine

Maryland
Gambino family Baltimore Crew (Baltimore) – defunct

Midwestern United States

Illinois
Chicago Outfit

Michigan
Detroit Partnership (Zerilli family)

Missouri
Kansas City crime family (Civella family)
St. Louis crime family (Giordano family)

Ohio
The city of Youngstown was at one point considered open territory, split between the Cleveland crime family (Porrello family) and the Pittsburgh crime family (LaRocca family).
Cleveland crime family (Porrello family)

Wisconsin
Milwaukee crime family (Balistrieri family)

Southern United States
Birmingham crime family – defunct since 1938

Florida
Trafficante crime family (Tampa area) – possibly defunct, Florida is considered open territory with many families operating in the area. 
The Chicago Outfit – is operating in South Florida
The Five Families of New York have crews operating in South Florida
Bonanno crime family – is operating in South Florida 
Colombo crime family's Florida faction – is operating in South Florida
Gambino crime family's Florida faction – is operating in South Florida and the Tampa Bay Area.
Genovese crime family – is operating in South Florida. See soldier Albert Facchiano
Lucchese crime family – is operating in South Florida and Central Florida Counties of Pasco and Pinellas.
DeCavalcante crime family – Florida faction is operating in Miami.

Louisiana
New Orleans crime family (Marcello family) – defunct

Texas
Dallas crime family (Civello family) – defunct
Maceo Organization (Galveston-Houston family) – defunct

Western United States

Arizona
 Chicago Outfit - (defunct) under Joseph "Papa Joe" Tocco the family operated in Phoenix
 Bonanno family Arizona crew - (defunct) under Salvatore Bonanno the family operated in Tucson

California
Los Angeles crime family (Los Angeles area)
San Francisco crime family (Lanza family) – defunct
San Jose crime family (Cerrito family) – defunct

Nevada
Las Vegas is considered open territory allowing all crime families to operate in the city's Casinos. Since the 1930s, the Los Angeles family, the Five Families of New York and the Midwest families have owned and operated in Casinos in the Las Vegas Strip.

See: Mobsters in Las Vegas

Colorado
Denver crime family (Smaldone family) – defunct

Washington
Seattle crime family (Colacurcio family)

Canada

Ontario
In Southern Ontario there are two types of Italian organized crime Cosa Nostra (Sicilian) and 'Ndrangheta (Calabrian). In the 2018 book, The Good Mothers: The True Story of the Women Who Took on the World's Most Powerful Mafia, Alex Perry reports that the Calabrian 'Ndrangheta has, for the past decade, been replacing the Sicilian Cosa Nostra as the primary drug traffickers in North America.

Musitano crime family – a Calabrian mafia family, based in Hamilton
Papalia crime family – a Calabrian mafia family, based in Hamilton, with strong connections to the Buffalo crime family
Luppino crime family – a Calabrian mafia family, based in Hamilton, with strong connections to the Buffalo crime family
Siderno Group – is the name for the "'Ndrangheta" clans (crime families). There have been seven senior 'Ndrangheta bosses in the Greater Toronto Area, some on the Camera di Controllo, the "board of directors" – namely in Vaughan. The Toronto-area Siderno group has included the Coluccio, Tavernese, DeMaria, Figliomeni, Ruso, and Commisso crime families; Carmine Verduci was also linked with the 'Ndrangheta group. Leaders are based both in Calabria and Ontario. The Siderno clans are part of the Commisso 'ndrina a crime family based in Calabria, Italy.

During a 2018 criminal trial, an Italian police expert testified that the 'Ndrangheta operated in the Greater Toronto Area and in Thunder Bay particularly in drug trafficking, extortion, loan sharking, theft of public funds, robbery, fraud, electoral crimes and crimes of violence. After the trial, Tom Andreopoulos, deputy chief federal prosecutor, said that this was the first time in Canada that the 'Ndrangheta was targeted as an organized crime group since 1997, when the Criminal Code was amended to include the offence of criminal organization. He offered this comment about the organization:"We’re talking about structured organized crime. We’re talking about a political entity, almost; a culture of crime that colonizes across the sea from Italy to Canada. This is one of the most sophisticated criminal organizations in the world."

Quebec
In Quebec there are two types of Italian organized crime: Cosa Nostra and 'Ndrangheta. While Canadian law enforcement agencies consider the Rizzuto and Cotroni crime families to be separate, the FBI considers them to be sub-units of the Bonanno crime family's Montreal faction.
Cotroni crime family – a "'Ndrangheta" family, the Calabrian faction
Cuntrera-Caruana Mafia clan – a Canadian extension of the Sicilian family
Rizzuto crime family – a "Cosa Nostra" family, the Sicilian faction

United Kingdom

England

 The Italian mob - led by Charles 'Darby' Sabini during the interwar years.
Bert "Battles" Rossi – Also known as the "General of Clerkenwell". He acted as the representative for the American mafia in London from the 1960s to the mid-1970s.
The Cortesi brothers – Rivals of the Sabini's.
 The Rocca family - A group of enforcers that were based in Islington.

Scotland
La Torre clan – a Camorra clan from Mondragone, Italy is operating in Aberdeen, Scotland and was led by Antonio La Torre.

Australia

New South Wales
Barbaro 'ndrina  – a Calabrian Clan based in Platì, Italy with operations in Griffith.
Robert Trimbole's Crew  (defunct), once controlled the marijuana drug market in Griffith.

Victoria
The Carlton Crew – a predominantly Sicilian group, operating in Melbourne.
The Honoured Society

Argentina

Santa Fe Province 
The Rosario mafia - led by Juan Galiffi during the 1920s and 1930s.

See also

 Timeline of organized crime
 List of Italian-American mobsters
 List of Italian-American mobsters by organization
 Jewish-American organized crime
 List of Jewish American mobsters
 Irish organized crime
 List of American mobsters of Irish descent
 List of mobsters by city
 List of criminal enterprises, gangs and syndicates

Notes

Sources

Capeci, Jerry. The Complete Idiot's Guide to the Mafia. Indianapolis: Alpha Books, 2002. 
Milhorn, H. Thomas. Crime: Computer Viruses to Twin Towers. Universal Publishers, 2005.

External links
 Gangrule, American mafia history
 Rick Porrello's 26 Cities with Mafia Families – AmericanMafia.com
 The AmericanMafia.com

 

 
Mafia crime families
 
Mafia crime families

Maf
Maf
Maf